Eric John Namesnik (August 7, 1970 – January 11, 2006), nicknamed "Snik," was an American competition swimmer and two-time Olympic silver medalist in the men's 400-meter individual relay (1992 & 1996).

Early years
Namesnik was born and raised in the town of Butler, Pennsylvania, and swam for the Butler YMCA Swim team while he was growing up. He initially attended Butler Area Senior High School, transferring after his sophomore season to Spanish River Community High School in Boca Raton, Florida. 

He accepted a swimming scholarship from the University of Michigan, to compete under coach Jon Urbanchek's Michigan Wolverines swimming and diving team from 1989 to 1993.

Swimming career
Namesnik represented the United States at two consecutive Olympic Games. At the 1992 Summer Olympics in Barcelona, Spain, he received his first Olympic medal, a silver, for his second-place performance in the men's 400-meter individual medley (4:15.57).

Four years later at the 1996 Summer Olympics in Atlanta, Georgia, he again finished second and received a silver medal in his signature event, the men's 400-meter individual medley (4:15.25).

He also won a bronze medal in the 400-meter individual medley at the 1994 world championships, and two silvers at the 1991 world meet. He set a new American record in the 400-meter individual medley on four occasions.

He later spent seven years (1997-2004) as an assistant with the men's Michigan Wolverines swimming and diving team under coach Jon Urbanchek. He was a volunteer assistant coach at Eastern Michigan University for two years before his death and was a coach for Wolverine Aquatics Club in Ann Arbor, Michigan.

Death
Namesnik died on January 11, 2006, from injuries sustained in a car accident the prior week. On January 7, 2006, he was critically injured in an accident that occurred when he attempted to pass another vehicle on an ice-covered road in Pittsfield Township, Michigan. He was survived by his wife, former swimmer Kirsten Silvester from the Netherlands, and their two children, Austin and Madison.  His former club team, Club Wolverine, hosts the Namesnik Memorial Grand Prix every spring in his honor.

He is memorialized with a statue outside of the Butler County YMCA, along with his childhood coach John "Pump" McLaughlin.

See also
 List of Olympic medalists in swimming (men)
 List of University of Michigan alumni
 List of World Aquatics Championships medalists in swimming (men)

References

External links
 
 Eric Namesnik Obituary

1970 births
2006 deaths
American male breaststroke swimmers
American male medley swimmers
American swimming coaches
Eastern Michigan University people
Michigan Wolverines men's swimmers
Michigan Wolverines swimming coaches
Olympic silver medalists for the United States in swimming
People from Butler, Pennsylvania
Road incident deaths in Michigan
Sportspeople from Pennsylvania
Swimmers at the 1992 Summer Olympics
Swimmers at the 1995 Pan American Games
Swimmers at the 1996 Summer Olympics
World Aquatics Championships medalists in swimming
Medalists at the 1996 Summer Olympics
Medalists at the 1992 Summer Olympics
Pan American Games silver medalists for the United States
Pan American Games bronze medalists for the United States
Pan American Games medalists in swimming
Medalists at the 1995 Pan American Games
20th-century American people